Psarades, is a village and a community of the Prespes municipality. Before the 2011 local government reform it was part of the municipality of Prespes, of which it was a municipal district.

Name
The current name of the village, Psarades, means "fishermen" in Greek. Until 1927, Psarades was known as Nivitsa. In Macedonian and in Bulgarian it is known as Нивици; Nivici/Nivitsi, meaning fields.

History
At the end of the 19th century, Nivitsi was a predominantly Bulgarian village. The Ethnography of the Adrianople, Monastir and Salonica villas, published in Constantinople in 1878 and reflecting the statistics of the 1873 male population, Nivitzi is referred to as a village in the kaza of Resen  with 30 households and 92 Bulgarians.

Another report, at the beginning of the 20th century, also stated that Nivitsi was a predominantly Bulgarian village. According to the statistics of Vasil Kanchov ("Macedonia, Ethnography and Statistics"), 200 Bulgarian Christians lived in the village in 1900. 

After the Ilinden Uprising in 1904, the whole village passed under the jurisdiction of the Bulgarian Exarchate. According to the Exarchist secretary Dimitar Mishev (1906), there were 528 Bulgarian Exarchists in Nivitsi. The Bulgarian church "Virgin Mary" was built here in 1893.

Prespa agreement

On 17 June 2018, the Prime Ministers of Greece and the Republic of Macedonia signed an agreement at the village, aiming the end of the Macedonia naming dispute. The Prespa Agreement took its name from homonymous lake, on the shores of which the village of Psarades was built.

Demographics
Psarades had 172 inhabitants in 1981. In fieldwork done by Riki Van Boeschoten in late 1993, Psarades was populated by Slavophones. The Macedonian language was spoken in the village by people over 30 in public and private settings. Children understood the language, but mostly did not use it.

The 2011 census recorded 83 inhabitants in the village. The community of Psarades covers an area of 41.064 km2 (15 sq. mi.).

See also
 List of settlements in the Florina regional unit

References

Populated places in Florina (regional unit)